Ira Mallory Remsen  (May 11, 1876 – November 29, 1928), known locally as Rem Remsen, was an American painter, playwright and Bohemian Club member. He was the son of Dr. Ira Remsen chemist and former president of Johns Hopkins University. Remsen was the author of children's plays notably Inchling and Mr. Blunt, he produced at the Forest Theater in Carmel-by-the-Sea, California in the 1920s. His studio on Dolores Street became the permanent home for the Carmel Art Association in 1933.

Early life 

Remsen was born on May 11, 1876, in Manhattan, New York City, New York. His father was Ira Remsen (1846-1927), and his mother was Elisabeth Hilleard Mallory (1854-). He was raised and educated in Baltimore, Maryland. At the age of 20, he went to Johns Hopkins University in 1895 and was in the class of Ninety-Seven.

In September 1898, he traveled to Paris, France. He studied art with Jean-Joseph Benjamin-Constant at the Académie Julian where he won an award for his paintings. He mastered portrait painting under Jacques Blanche and trained with painter Jean-Paul Laurens at the École des Beaux-Arts. He became a member of the American Art Association in Paris where he exhibited his portraits.

Professional background

On his return from Paris, Remsen enlisted in the U.S. Army in San Francisco, California, on April 1900. He then returned to his family home in Baltimore. He established an art studio at 80 Washington Square, New York City. He married Mary Hall Putnam (1878-1905) on May 24, 1902, in Manhattan, New York City. They were divorced on April 1, 1910, on the allegation of "failure to provide and willful neglect". Remsen became familiar with stagecraft by working with the Provincetown Players in New York. 

While living in Greenwich Village, New York, Remsen stunted a fake marriage to Marie Centlivre, born of French parents in Indiana, on April 27, 1917. Centlivre was an actress in New York where they produced the play The Man Who Married an Ostrich.

By 1918, Remsen left New York and moved to Long Beach, California. On September 12, 1918, he registered for the draft during World War I at the local board in Long Beach. He was disqualified for active service because of ill health but served his county by being detailed to the Los Angeles shipyard to camouflage war vessels for the US Government. He also worked as a technical director of the Lobero Theatre in Santa Barbara, California.

During his two years stay in Long Beach, he wrote The Water Lily, a poetic play in four acts on the life Hokusai, one of the master artists of Japan. He worked with M. A. Morrison editor of the Long Beach  Press, in writing a series of one-act plays. He sketched and wrote at Signal Hill, located high on a hill. He then moved to Santa Monica, California to continue his art and playwright work.

Carmel-by-the-Sea

In 1921, Remsen moved into a campsite at the tree-bound Forest Theater in Carmel-by-the-Sea, California. In May 1922, he held sketching and exhibition studios at the nearby Carmel Highlands.

He married his second wife, Helen "Yodee" Armstrong Yoder on September 25, 1922 in Topeka, Kansas. She was a movie actress and society editor of the Topeka newspaper. She had a supporting role in the 1919 silent movie A Midnight Romance starring Anita Stewart. They moved into a cottage in downtown Carmel-by-the-Sea. She later became a sales representative for the Carmel Land Company.

Inchling

Remsen wrote a three-act children's fantasy play called Inchling, that was a story of an inch worm and its struggle for wings, which captured the fantasies of young children. It was directed by Blanche Tolmie at the Forest Theater and played from August 19 through 20, 1922. Walter Flanders played the character Inchling. Composer Thomas Vincent Cator wrote the composition operetta for the play. Remsen designed the Inchling sets, the costumes and the lights. He loved working with the children and they loved him.

Carmel's master builder M. J. Murphy's daughters Kathleen and Rosalie had parts in the play along with other Carmel children.

On August 3, 1928, Remsen's play Inchling was presented at the Forest Theater for the second time under the direction of Garnet Holm. The play was rejected by New York producers after Remsen submitted the play for a theatrical release. The rejection threw him into a depression. He talked about George Sterling's death as a "glorious finish".

Other works

In 1922, Remsen helped Jo Mora build the model of the Sphinx for Edward G. Kuster's production of the play Caesar and Cleopatra.

In October 1922, Remsen wrote and produced a marionette play The Rented Farm. He then staged it in 1923 in Los Angeles under the title The Rented Ranch, which was produced again in Carmel in the fall of 1938.

In December 1922, Remsen produced a Christmas play, the Shepherd's Bridge, at the Carmel Arts and Crafts Hall in Carmel-by-the-Sea.

Remsen became the director of the Community Playhouse of Santa Barbara in 1923. In April 1924, he produced a historical play, King Solomon, while at the Community Playhouse.

Mr. Bunt

On his return to Carmel in 1924, Remsen produced the four-act play Mr. Bunt at the Forest Theater from July 3 through 5th. It won the $100 award for the best original play submitted in the annual play contest held by the Forest Theater Society. The play was adapted for the outdoor amphitheater. The play had a fairy bridge, Gyem, the woodsprite, and included fairies, circus girls, Charles King Van Riper as the clown, and John Northern Hilliard as Danny.

Mr. Bunt was planned and written in his studio on Dolores Street. The manuscript for the play was titled Mr. Bunt, Concerning the Invisible Playmates of Our Childhood, and was dedicated to his wife Yodee.

The performance of Mr. Bunt had mixed reviews. The Theatre Arts Monthly said:

Painting and other plays

Remsen devoted his spare time to art. He taught classes on theater arts at the Carmel Summer School of Art sponsored by the Carmel Arts and Crafts Club at its eleventh season in July 1924. He taught portrait and figure work from a live model, still life, and color arrangements.

In August 1925, Remsen went with painters Ray Strong, Ferdinand Burgdorff, and Frank Van Sloun for a two-month sketching trip to Grand Canyon and Flagstaff, Arizona. There he met printmaker Ernest Haskell and the landscape painter Jimmy Swinnerton. 

Remsen went again to Arizona in September 1926 to paint historic pueblos with Stanley Wood.

In December 1925, Remsen wrote and staged the play The Gingerbread Man, at the Carmel Arts and Crafts Hall. The Carmel Pine Cone said: "Rem's play was very effective and quite in keeping with the spirit of the season. Our Carmel children certainly had a fine Christmas party."

For the 1925 Carmel Follies, he played the part of a negro and two years later in 1927, he took the title role of Uncle Tom at the Golden Bough production of Uncle Tom's Cabin.

Remsen and his wife, Yodee, were divorced in April 1926 because of his "moodiness".

In the December 1926 issue of Game and Gossip magazine, it was reported that Remsen painted the portrait of dancer Hildreth Taylor, which was on display at the Palace of the Legion of Honor in San Francisco.

Remsen's life-size portrait of his father, Dr. Ira Remsen, was exhibited at the Hotel Del Monte Art Gallery from June through November 1926. The Carmel Pine Cone said "the canvas shows to an advantage the unusual prowess of Remsen in portrait painting." A second painting was presented to Johns Hopkins University on the anniversary of its founding. He also did the drawings of Marquis Itō of Japan when he was on shipboard, and of sculptor and painter Frederick MacMonnies when he was in Paris in 1901.

In 1926, Remsen painted two full-length oil canvas portraits, one of poet Robinson Jeffers at Carmel Point with the Carmel River in the background, and the other of Jeffer's wife Una. In June 1926 the painting of Robinson Jeffers was displayed in the Los Angeles Times and  The Carmel Cymbal. In April 1946, the portrait was on display at the Carmel Art Association and then went as a gift to the Robinson Jeffers collection at the Occidental College library. In 1994, it was reproduced on the cover of Robinson Jeffers Newsletter (Winter 1994), and hangs in the Jeffers Room at the Mary Norton Clapp Library at Occidental College.

Remsen regularly attended the San Francisco Bohemian Club's summer camp at the Bohemian Grove along the Russian River where he helped produce plays for the "Jinks". He was the editor and founder of The Daily Grove News, which was published three weeks every summer for club members. It was posted daily on a bulletin board in the grove. It was filled with cartoons, poems, and jokes about the celebrities of the club.

His works appeared at the Annual Exhibition at the Bohemian Club in San Francisco in 1926 and 1927. He displayed four works, the portraits of his father, Robinson Jeffers, Tao, a woman in black reclining on a red couch; and a large colorful oil on canvas painting entitled Pop Emest. In 1928, Pop Emest got praise for his painting at the Bohemian Club. The San Francisco Chronicle chose it to say: "The colorful picture of Pos Ernst by Rem Remsen is attracting much attention. It's fresh, cool greens are particularly pleasing."

In July 1927, Sally's on Ocean Avenue staged a solo show of his watercolors, Indian portraits, and dwellings.  In September 1926, Daisy Brown of the Carmel Pine Cone said:

In July 1926, Remsen was interviewed by Daisy Brown of the Carmel Pine Cone who said Remsen "is destined to be acclaimed nationally and probably universally as a great artist within the next few years".

Remsen's father died at Carmel's Pine Inn on March 4, 1927 and his ashes were sent to Johns Hopkins University.

In June 1927, he was one of the writers in the story What's It All About?, sponsored by the Carmel Cymbal magazine.  Writer, actor, and director Perry Newberry said this about his contribution to the story:

In July 1927, Remsen completed his art studio and residence on Dolores Street between 5th and 6th Avenues. The studio was a gathering place for artists and became known for its afternoon teas. It was open to the public on Saturday afternoons.

On December 24, 1927, Remsen produced a Christmas fantasy The Tinsel Angel, with the three wise men and angels that sang Christmas carols. It was performed at his Dolores Street studio for the village children on Christmas Eve. His hospitality was well received. During Christmas week he sold several hundred copies of the play, illustrated with linoleum cuts by Robert W. Westwood, for $1 a copy.

In February 1928, Remsen displayed two paintings, Cathedral Rock and Hopi House-First Mesa-Arizona, at the First State-wide Annual in Santa Cruz, California. During the spirng 1928, his watercolor Seagulls and Fishermen and several oils were exhibited at the Del Monte Hotel Gallery.

Death

Remsen died by suicide on November 29, 1928, in his studio on Dolores Street in Carmel-by-the-Sea, California, at the age of 52. He left his personal effects to ex-wife, Helen Yoder Remsen, and his property worth $3,000 to his brother Dr. Charles M. Remsen of New York. According to the San Francisco Chronicle, Four events triggered his suicide, the recent death of his father, his own ill-health, his second wife's divorce, and failure to produce his play The Inchling on the New York stage.

His body was shipped to New York to his mother and brother on December 2, 1928. Funeral services were held on December 7, 1928 at the Calvary Church Chapel in New York City with burial at the family plot at the Green-Wood Cemetery in Brooklyn, New York.

Plays

Paintings

Legacy

Remsen was active with the Carmel Art Association when it was at the corner of Seventh and Lincoln Street in Carmel-by-the-Sea. On July 8, 1929, artists Ray and Dorthy Woodward purchased Rem's studio for $6,000. In the fall of 1933, the Carmel Art Association was moved to its present location on Dolores Street, when the organization purchased Remsen's studio with a loan from businessman Barnet J. Segal (1898-1985). Today part of the Remsen's original studio  survives as the Beardsley Room inside the building.

Remsen's musical fantasy play Inchling was published after Remsen's death, by C. C. Birchard Co., of Boston in 1931, with lyrics by Irene Alexannder and a musical score by Thomas Vincent Cator. It has been produced by schools and children's theater groups throughout the county. Byington Ford directed Inchling at the Douglas School (now Stevenson School) in Pebble Beach, California in June 1934. In September 1936, Inchling was presented again under the direction of Ford from September 3 and 4 at the Forest Theater by the Carmel Community Players.

In November 1950, the Harrison Memorial Library held an exhibit honoring Remsen with a display of his published works including Mr. Bunt, Inchling, and The Tinsel Angel programs of performances given at the Forest Theater, and the three-sided stage set for the production of Mr. Bunt. Several items on display were contributed by the director Blanche Tolmie.

See also
 Timeline of Carmel-by-the-Sea, California

References

External links

  Artists in California
 Interview with Gordon Greene
 Interview with Helen Wilson and Rosalee Gladney

1876 births
1928 deaths
People from California
People from New York (state)
Painters from California
Artists from California
19th-century American dramatists and playwrights
People from Carmel-by-the-Sea, California
20th-century American artists
20th-century American painters